Clive Best (4 August 1931 – 17 April 2013) was a Welsh rugby union, and professional rugby league footballer who played in the 1950s.

Background
Clive Best was born in Tredegar, Wales, he worked in the Accounts Department in the Vickers-Armstrongs Shipbuilders in Barrow-in-Furness, he trained as a social worker, and he and his wife Gay became residential Social Workers in Hornchurch, Essex, he later became a Senior Advisor in the Social Services, by 1980 he had qualified as a teacher, and he and Gay became Principal, and Matron (respectively) of a Residential School in Cwmbran. Following rugby union becoming professional, he was re-instated by the Welsh Rugby Union, and became the Chairman of the Welsh Counties RFC, Secretary of the Breconshire County RFC, and Chairman of the Ebbw Vale RFC Past Players Association, and he died aged 81 in Crickhowell, Wales.

Playing career
On 21 November 1952, Best changed rugby football codes from rugby union to rugby league when he transferred from Ebbw Vale to Barrow, for a signing-on fee of £900 (based on increases in average earnings, this would be approximately £62,900 in 2016), with which he bought 23 Windsor Street, Barrow. He had previously had a trial at Oldham, but had declined an offer to join them. He made his début for Barrow against Bramley at Craven Park, Barrow-in-Furness on Saturday 22 November 1952. He played  in Barrow's 21-12 victory over Workington Town in the 1954–55 Challenge Cup Final during the 1954–55 season at Wembley Stadium, London on Saturday 30 April 1955, in front of a crowd of 66,513. He left Barrow in 1956, and was replaced by Joe Ball. He played his last match for Barrow against Wakefield Trinity at Belle Vue, Wakefield on Saturday 24 March 1956.

Genealogical information
Clive Best's marriage to Gay (née Phillips) (c.1930s – 2012) was registered during third ¼ 1954 in Crickhowell district. They had children; Rhodri Best (birth registered first ¼  in Barrow-in-Furness), and Deri Best (birth registered fourth ¼  in Romford), who both went on to play for London Welsh RFC.

References

External links
Search for "Best" at rugbyleagueproject.org
Clive Best RIP

1931 births
2013 deaths
Barrow Raiders players
Bradford Bulls players
Ebbw Vale RFC players
Rugby league centres
Rugby league fullbacks
Rugby league players from Tredegar
Rugby league wingers
Rugby union fullbacks
Rugby union players from Tredegar
Welsh rugby league players
Welsh rugby union players